The 2014 European Curling Championships were held November 22 to 29 at the Palladium de Champéry in Champéry, Switzerland. Switzerland last hosted the European Curling Championships in 2010, when it was also held in Champéry. The Group C competitions was held in October at the PWA Silverdome in Zoetermeer, the Netherlands.

At the conclusion of the championships, the top eight women's teams will go to the 2015 World Women's Curling Championship in Sapporo, and the top eight men's teams will go to the 2015 Ford World Men's Curling Championship in Halifax.

This edition of the European Curling Championships marks the first appearance of Israel at an international curling event. The Israeli men's curling team will compete in the Group C tournament in Zoetermeer.

Men

Group A
The Group A competitions will be contested in Champéry.

Round-robin standings
Final round-robin standings

Russia were eliminated from the tiebreaker by virtue of their head-to-head record against the other teams.

Playoffs

Bronze Medal Game
Friday, November 28, 19:30

Gold Medal Game
Saturday, November 29, 15:00

Group B
The Group B competitions will be contested in Monthey.

Round-robin standings
Final round-robin standings

Team France did not attend the Group B tournament, and were given automatic forfeits for each of their games.

Playoffs

Bronze Medal Game
Friday, November 28, 10:00

Gold Medal Game
Friday, November 28, 10:00

Group C
The Group C competitions will be contested in Zoetermeer.

Round-robin standings
Final round-robin standings

Playoffs

Women

Group A
The Group A competitions will be contested in Champéry.

Round-robin standings
Final round-robin standings

Playoffs

Bronze Medal Game
Friday, November 28, 19:30

Gold Medal Game
Saturday, November 29, 10:00

Group B
The Group B competitions will be contested in Champéry.

Round-robin standings
Final round-robin standings

Playoffs

Bronze Medal Game
Friday, November 28, 10:00

Gold Medal Game
Friday, November 28, 10:00

Group C
The Group C competitions will be contested in Zoetermeer.

Round-robin standings
Final round-robin standings

Playoffs

References
General
Specific

External links

2014 in curling
2014
Curling competitions in Switzerland
2014 in Swiss sport
Sport in Valais
International sports competitions hosted by Switzerland
November 2014 sports events in Europe